Mario Hoyer (born 26 July 1965) is an East German bobsledder who competed in the late 1980s. He won the bronze medal in the two-man event at the 1988 Winter Olympics in Calgary.

References

 Bobsleigh two-man Olympic medalists 1932–56 and since 1964
 DatabaseOlympics.com profile

1965 births
Bobsledders at the 1988 Winter Olympics
German male bobsledders
Olympic bobsledders of East Germany
Olympic bronze medalists for East Germany
Living people
Olympic medalists in bobsleigh
Medalists at the 1988 Winter Olympics